The Owen Wister Review is the University of Wyoming's annual art and literature magazine produced through the Student Media department, which publishes creative non-fiction, poetry, fiction, and art. The editorial staff is made up entirely of undergraduate and graduate students. The journal was established in 1978 and named for Owen Wister, who set the first modern western novel, The Virginian, not far from Laramie, in the town of Medicine Bow.

In 2008 and again in 2009, the magazine was awarded a Magazine Pacemaker Award by the Associated College Press.

See also
List of literary magazines

References

External links
 
 
 

1978 establishments in Wyoming
Literary magazines published in the United States
Student magazines published in the United States
Annual magazines published in the United States
Magazines established in 1978
Magazines published in Wyoming
University of Wyoming